Timomenus komarowi, also known as Timomenus komarovi, is a species of earwig in the family Forficulidae.

Description 
Males of T. komarowi are 24.5–26.5 mm long with forceps 10.0–11.5 mm long. Females are 15.0–17.0 mm with forceps 5.5–7.5 mm.

Range 
This species is found in Asia.

Locomotion 
The methods by which T. komarowi moves on both rough and smooth surfaces have been investigated using scanning electron microscopy. It attaches to rough surfaces using the pretarsal claws on its legs, and attaches to smooth surfaces using two groups of hairy tarsal pads.

References 

Forficulidae